The following is an overview of the events of 1889 in film, including a list of films released and notable births.

Events

 Eastman Kodak is the first company to begin commercial production of film on a flexible transparent base, celluloid.
 The first moving pictures developed on celluloid film are made in Hyde Park, London by William Friese Greene.
 Wordsworth Donisthorpe invents the Kinesigraph, which photographs a round image on 68 mm film.
 William K. L. Dickson completes his work for Thomas Edison on the Kinetograph cylinder either in this year or 1890. Monkeyshines No. 1 becomes the first film shot on the system.

Films
Leisurely Pedestrians, Open Topped Buses and Hansom Cabs with Trotting Horses (also known as Hyde Park Corner), a lost film and the first moving picture developed on celluloid film, directed by William Friese-Greene
Monkeyshines No. 1 – contradictory sources indicate this was shot either in June 1889 or November 1890.

Births

References

 
Film by year
Articles containing video clips